Listvyanka is the name of several inhabited localities in Russia.

Urban localities
Listvyanka, Irkutsky District, Irkutsk Oblast, a work settlement in Irkutsky District, Irkutsk Oblast

Rural localities
Listvyanka, Altai Krai, a selo in Chauzovsky Selsoviet of Topchikhinsky District of Altai Krai
Listvyanka, Kuytunsky District, Irkutsk Oblast, a village in Kuytunsky District, Irkutsk Oblast
Listvyanka, Izhmorsky District, Kemerovo Oblast, a village in Troitskaya Rural Territory of Izhmorsky District of Kemerovo Oblast
Listvyanka, Tisulsky District, Kemerovo Oblast, a village in Listvyanskaya Rural Territory of Tisulsky District of Kemerovo Oblast
Listvyanka, Topkinsky District, Kemerovo Oblast, a settlement in Shishinskaya Rural Territory of Topkinsky District of Kemerovo Oblast
Listvyanka, Tyazhinsky District, Kemerovo Oblast, a settlement in Listvyanskaya Rural Territory of Tyazhinsky District of Kemerovo Oblast
Listvyanka, Kurgan Oblast, a village in Kosolapovsky Selsoviet of Tselinny District of Kurgan Oblast
Listvyanka, Moscow Oblast, a settlement in Bereznyakovskoye Rural Settlement of Sergiyevo-Posadsky District of Moscow Oblast
Listvyanka, Novosibirsk Oblast, a selo in Cherepanovsky District of Novosibirsk Oblast
Listvyanka, Orenburg Oblast, a settlement in Burlyksky Selsoviet of Belyayevsky District of Orenburg Oblast
Listvyanka, Ryazan Oblast, a settlement in Listvyansky Rural Okrug of Ryazansky District of Ryazan Oblast